Kurixalus is a genus of frogs in the family Rhacophoridae. The taxonomy of small rhacophids is difficult and has been subject to many revisions, but molecular genetic data do support monophyly of Kurixalus. These frogs are distributed from Himalayan front ranges of eastern India southward and eastward to Cambodia, Vietnam, southern China, Taiwan, and the Ryukyu Islands.

Species
, the following 19 species are recognized:

 Kurixalus absconditus Mediyansyah, Hamidy, Munir, and Matsui, 2019 – Piasak-frilled swamp treefrog
 Kurixalus appendiculatus (Günther, 1858) – frilled tree frog, rough-armed tree frog, or Southeast Asian tree frog
 Kurixalus baliogaster (Inger, Orlov, and Darevsky, 1999) – belly-spotted frog
 Kurixalus banaensis (Bourret, 1939) – Bana bubble-nest frog
 Kurixalus berylliniris Wu, Huang, Tsai, Li, Jhang, and Wu, 2016 
 Kurixalus bisacculus (Taylor, 1962) − Taylor's treefrog
 Kurixalus chaseni (Smith, 1924) 
 Kurixalus eiffingeri (Boettger, 1895) 
 Kurixalus gracilloides Nguyen, Duong, Luu, and Poyarkov, 2020 
 Kurixalus hainanus (Zhao, Wang, and Shi, 2005) 
 Kurixalus idiootocus (Kuramoto and Wang, 1987) – temple tree frog
 Kurixalus lenquanensis Yu, Wang, Hou, Rao, and Yang, 2017 
 Kurixalus motokawai Nguyen, Matsui, and Eto, 2014 
 Kurixalus naso (Annandale, 1912) – uphill tree frog, long-snouted treefrog, Annandale's high altitude frog
 Kurixalus odontotarsus (Ye and Fei, 1993) – serrate-legged small treefrog
 Kurixalus verrucosus (Boulenger, 1893) – small rough-armed tree frog
 Kurixalus viridescens Nguyen, Matsui, and Duc, 2014 
 Kurixalus wangi Wu, Huang, Tsai, Li, Jhang, and Wu, 2016 
 Kurixalus yangi Yu, Hui, Rao, and Yang, 2018

References

 
Rhacophoridae
Amphibians of Asia
Amphibian genera